Klek may refer to:

 Klek, Zrenjanin, a village in Serbia
 Klek, Croatia, a village in southern Croatia
 Klek, Istočno Novo Sarajevo, a village in Bosnia and Herzegovina
 Klek, Prozor, a village in Bosnia and Herzegovina
 Klek mountain, Croatia
 Klek (peninsula), a peninsula near Neum, Bosnia and Herzegovina
 Klek (Karawanks), a peak in the Karawanks in Slovenia
 Klek, Trbovlje, a village in the Municipality of Trbovlje, central Slovenia
 Klęk, a village in Poland

People
 Hanna Marie Klek (born 1995), German chess grandmaster